Holland Park is a southern suburb in the City of Brisbane, Queensland, Australia.

Geography 
It is mostly residential, with some commercial areas along Logan Road.

Holland Park is an older suburb made of largely post-World War II wooden homes. Logan Road bisects the slightly hilly suburb.  There are a number of schools and parks in the suburb and a retail zone with shops and a public bar. It is also home to the Mount Thompson crematorium, Queensland oldest crematorium, in Nursery Road.

History 
Holland Park owes its name to the late Julius Holland, who, for many years, owned a large area of scrub land which he had bought on speculation. The estate stretched from what is now Abbotsleigh Street to the vicinity of Arnold Street, and from Logan Road back to Cavendish Road.

The Holland Park area was settled from 1865 with the land used mainly used for farming.

In 1882, Julius Holland sold "Holland Estate". These 150 acres of scrub, in the true sense, was Holland Park proper; but as estates in the vicinity also adopted the Holland Park name, an elastic meaning has been given to the name, and a much more extensive area is now comprehensively known as Holland Park. On Saturday 24 May 1884, the Windsor Castle Estate was auctioned by John F. Buckland. The subdivision consisted of 217 allotments. The subdivision "commanding view of the city and the whole of the surrounding country from bay to the city". Tarana Estate was auctioned on Saturday 20 November 1926 by Blocksidge and Ferguson Ltd. The allotments advertising poster indicates sites have "electric light at the estate. Framont Estate on Logan Road was advertised for auction on 30 Oct 1926, 55 allotments were for sale. Estates had "all perfect building blocks, nice slope, high and breezy, extra large areas, well drained, ideal surroundings, graded and formed roads". Stonehaven Heights Estate centered on Raff Avenue was subject to a private sale on 25 March 1931; the locality had previously been advertised for sale on 28 September 1918.

In 1918, Roman Catholic Archbishop of Brisbane, James Duhig purchased 3 acres of land in the Yuletide Estate for a church and school.In 1926 the Logan Road tramway was extended to a new terminus at Holland Park. Trams commenced operation on the route on Sunday 1 August 1926.

Holland Park Baptist Church opened on Saturday 15 December 1928 by the President of the Baptist Union, Reverend Alfred George Weller. In 1970 a new church building was constructed on the site, with the former church relocated to the rear of the site. The Grace Bible Church which now occupies the site is not affiliated with the Baptist Union.

Holland Park State School opened on 28 January 1929.

Mount Thompson Crematorium officially opened on Sunday 9 September 1934, Queensland's first crematorium.

Construction of the Catholic school commenced on Sunday 26 July 1936 when Duhig placed the foundation stone for school. On Sunday 1 November 1936 Duhig officially opened St Joachim's school, announcing that a brick church would soon be built alongside the school. The school commenced operation on 1 February 1938 operated by the Sisters of St Joseph. On Sunday 14 March 1937, Duhig opened the presbytery for the church.

During World War II, the United States Army established the 42nd General Hospital with over 2000 beds on Logan Road in 1942. After the war, Brisbane had a housing shortage and people began squatting in some of the American army hospital huts, then owned by the Australian Government. In 1947, the Queensland Government began to convert the huts to be more suitable for housing and the squatters became official tenants of the Queensland Housing Commission.

Holland Park Housing Settlement School opened on 27 January 1948. It closed on 22 January 1956 to be replaced by Seville Road State School which opened on 23 January 1956.

Following complaints that police stations were not readily identifiable, the Queensland Department of Works was asked to supply conspicuous illuminated signs showing POLICE in black letters on a white background. On 5 May 1959, a sample illuminated sign was erected at Holland Park police station and with that success, an order was placed with Albert Smith and Son to manufacture these signs.

In 1964, St Joachin's Catholic primary school expanded with the opening of a secondary school for girls called St Joseph's High School for Girls. The secondary school opened with 93 girls under the direction of principal Sister Margaret Mary Campbell assisted by Sister Pius Cassidy and Sister Mary Rose. In 1970. St Joseph's relocated to Klumpp Road, Mount Gravatt and was renamed McKillop College after Sister Mary McKillop, the founder of the Sisters of St Joseph's. McKillop College was neighbour to Clairvaux College, a Catholic secondary school for boys. In 1988, the two schools were amalgamated into secondary co-educational school named to Clairvaux MacKillop College.

Trams operated by the Brisbane City Council operated along Logan Road until 13 April 1969.

Cavendish Road State High School opened on 9 April 1951.

The Holland Park Library opened in 1980 with a major refurbishment in 2015.

The  recorded 7,849 residents in Holland Park, of whom 52% were female and 48% were male. The median age of the population was 35; two years younger than the Australian median. 77.3% of people living in Holland Park were born in Australia, compared to the national average of 69.8%. The other most common countries of birth were England (3.2%), New Zealand (2.9%), India (0.9%), Somalia (0.7%), and Scotland (0.6%). 85.1% of people only spoke English at home, while the next most commonly spoken languages were Greek (1.2%), Somali (1.1%), Spanish (0.9%), Arabic (0.8%), and Hindi (0.7%).

Heritage listings 
There are a number of heritage-listed sites in Holland Park, including:

 137 Abbotsleigh Street: Holland Park State School
 141 Abbotsleigh Street: Sir William Flood Webb's House
 35 Berkeley Street: Malouf Residence
 309 Nursery Road: Brisbane Mosque
 329 Nursery Road: Mount Thompson Memorial Gardens & Crematorium
 Outside 695 Cavendish Road: former Trolleybus Shelter
 Outside 830 Logan Road: former Tram Shelter No. 2
 20 Percival Terrace: Catt's House
 30 Percival Terrace: John Kindler's House
 20 Wilbur Street: Mathers' House

Education 

Holland Park State School is a government primary (Prep-6) school for boys and girls at 59 Abbotsleigh Street. In 2017, the school had an enrolment of 853 students with 62 teachers (49 full-time equivalent) and 41 non-teaching staff (23 full-time equivalent).

St Joachim's School is a Catholic primary (Prep-6) school for boys and girls at 41 Yuletide Street. In 2017, the school had an enrolment of 303 students with 24 teachers (19 full-time equivalent) and 19 non-teaching staff (8 full-time equivalent).

Seville Road State School is a government primary (Prep-6) school for boys and girls at Cnr Oates Avenue & Roscoe Street. In 2017, the school had an enrolment of 130 students with 16 teachers (13 full-time equivalent) and 9 non-teaching staff (5 full-time equivalent). It includes a special education program.

Cavendish Road State High School is a government secondary (7-12) school for boys and girls at the corner of Cavendish and Holland Roads. In 2017, the school had an enrolment of 1688 students with 126 teachers (117 full-time equivalent) and 55 non-teaching staff (35 full-time equivalent). It includes a special education program.

Amenities 
The Brisbane City Council operates a public library at 81 Seville Road.

References

External links

 
ourBrisbane.com – Holland Park via the Wayback Machine archive

 
Suburbs of the City of Brisbane